The Imperial and Royal General Staff of Austria-Hungary was part of the Ministry of War. It was headed by the Chief of the General Staff for the Whole Armed Forces (Chef des Generalstabes für die gesamte bewaffnete Macht), who had direct access to the Emperor.

Responsibilities
The general staff was responsible for planning and preparations, while the Armeeoberkommando (AOK) was the operational high command. In fact, since the AOK was under the direct command of the Emperor and the Chief of the General Staff was his chief adviser, in practice the AOK was under the control of the Chief of the General Staff.

List of chiefs of the general staff
† denotes people who died in office.

Bibliography
Lackey, Scott W. The Rebirth of the Habsburg Army: Friedrich Beck and the Rise of the General Staff. Greenwood Press, 1995.
Rothenberg, Gunther E. The Army of Francis Joseph. Purdue University Press, 1998.
Sondhaus, Lawrence. Franz Conrad Von Hötzendorf: Architect of the Apocalypse. Humanities Press, 2000.

See also
Supreme Commander of the Imperial and Royal Armed Forces

Staff (military)
Military history of Austria-Hungary
Military of Austria-Hungary
Military units and formations established in 1867
Military units and formations disestablished in 1918